Oxford Gardens is a 2015 film produced and directed by Obi Emelonye.

Background and synopsis
Shot in London, United States and premiered in Nigeria on 18 December 2015, Oxford Gardens was released as a collaborative work between Obi Emelonye and M-Net through Africa Magic Original Films. It is a boxing-themed film centred on luck, love and redemption.

Cast
Ngoli Okafor
Ngozi Thompson Igwebike
Savanah Roy
Nnenna Ani 
D'Richy Obi-Emelonye

References

External links

2015 films
2010s sports films
Boxing films
Films directed by Obi Emelonye
English-language Nigerian films
2010s English-language films